The 1944 United States House of Representatives elections in South Carolina were held on November 7, 1944, to select six Representatives for two-year terms from the state of South Carolina.  All five incumbents who ran were re-elected and the open seat in the 2nd congressional district was retained by the Democrats.  The composition of the state delegation thus remained solely Democratic.

1st congressional district
Incumbent Democratic Congressman L. Mendel Rivers of the 1st congressional district, in office since 1941, defeated Republican challenger O.H. Wilcox.

General election results

|-
| 
| colspan=5 |Democratic hold
|-

2nd congressional district special election
Incumbent Democratic Congressman Hampton P. Fulmer of the 2nd congressional district died on October 19, 1944, and a special election was called for November 7 to be held simultaneously with the regular election.  Fulmer's widow, Willa L. Fulmer, was unopposed in the special election to serve out the remainder of the term.

General election results

|-
| 
| colspan=5 |Democratic hold
|-

2nd congressional district
Willa L. Fulmer, who ran in the special election for the 2nd congressional district, was not also a contestant for the regular election to the 79th Congress.  John J. Riley won the Democratic primary on November 1 and defeated Republican H.G. Willingham in the general election.

Democratic primary

General election results

|-
| 
| colspan=5 |Democratic hold
|-

3rd congressional district
Incumbent Democratic Congressman Butler B. Hare of the 3rd congressional district, in office since 1939, won the Democratic primary and defeated Republican D.F. Merrill in the general election.

Democratic primary

General election results

|-
| 
| colspan=5 |Democratic hold
|-

4th congressional district
Incumbent Democratic Congressman Joseph R. Bryson of the 4th congressional district, in office since 1939, defeated Republican challenger J.G. Jones.

General election results

|-
| 
| colspan=5 |Democratic hold
|-

5th congressional district
Incumbent Democratic Congressman James P. Richards of the 5th congressional district, in office since 1933, defeated Republican challenger W.I. Bost.

General election results

|-
| 
| colspan=5 |Democratic hold
|-

6th congressional district
Incumbent Democratic Congressman John L. McMillan of the 6th congressional district, in office since 1939, defeated Republican challenger C.B. Ruffin.

General election results

|-
| 
| colspan=5 |Democratic hold
|-

See also
United States House of Representatives elections, 1944
United States Senate election in South Carolina, 1944
South Carolina's congressional districts

References

"Supplemental Report of the Secretary of State to the General Assembly of South Carolina." Reports and Resolutions of South Carolina to the General Assembly of the State of South Carolina. Volume I. Columbia, SC: 1945, pp. 11–13, 36.

1944
South Carolina
United States House of Representatives